Acronicta parallela, the parallel dagger moth, is a species of moth of the family Noctuidae. It was considered a synonym of Acronicta falcula but reinstated as a valid species in 2011. It is found in North America, including Colorado and Oklahoma.

References 

Acronicta
Moths of North America
Moths described in 1879